Brother Sister is an album by British acid jazz and funk group the Brand New Heavies, released on March 22, 1994 by Delicious Vinyl. It spawned several singles, including "Spend Some Time" which spent two weeks at number two on the American dance charts. A cover of Maria Muldaur's "Midnight at the Oasis" became popular in the UK, but was not included in the US version of the album.

Brother Sister was lead singer N'Dea Davenport's last album with the Brand New Heavies before leaving to complete her solo album (which she had put on hold to join the Heavies). She returned to join the band ten years later.

Critical reception 
Pan-European magazine Music & Media wrote, "Still punch drunk from the single "Dream On Dreamer", the heavy weights of acid jazz hit you knock out with this 15-track album. It can be divided into three rounds--a strong opening and end with some shadow boxing inbetween. In "round 1" N'Dea Davenport powerlifts the title track with its electric piano to the level of '70s jazz funk outfit Deodato. When it really comes to hard hitting, in "round 3," she "kills" the "Fake" opponent with a swing not heard from the UK since the heyday of the Average White Band."

Track listing

Personnel 
The Brand New Heavies
 N'Dea Davenport  – lead and backing vocals, keyboards, percussion	
 Simon Bartholomew  – guitar, backing vocals, percussion
 Andrew Levy  – bass, backing vocals, keyboards, percussion, string arrangements
 Jan Kincaid  – drums, backing and lead vocals, percussion, keyboards

Musicians
 Maxton G. Beesley, Jr.  – keyboards
 Brady Blade, Jr.  – vocals (background), production coordination
 Mike Boito  – keyboards, vocals (background)
 The Brand New Heavies  – percussion, producer, engineer, art direction, mixing
 Amp Fiddler  – keyboards
 Ray Gaskins  – saxophone, vocals (background)
 John Thirkell - trumpet, flugelhorn (Solo on "Dream on Dreamer")
 Gerard Presencer  – trumpet, flugelhorn
 Kevin Robinson  – trumpet
 Dennis Rollins  – trombone, trombone (Tenor)
 Eric Sarafin  – strings, engineer, mixing
 Jeff Scantlebury  – percussion
 Mike Smith  – flute, saxophone
 Steve Williamson  – saxophone
 Aaron Zigman  – string arrangements

Production
 Matthew Donaldson – photography
 Brian Gardner – mastering
 Chris Jones – engineer
 John Laker – engineer
 Michael C. Ross – executive producer, mixing
 Martin Schmelze – engineer
 Yo-Yo – engineer

Remix album 

Excursions: Remixes & Rare Grooves was released in the United States by Delicious Vinyl Records. This album functions as a component to the US release of Brother Sister. Its cover art mimics the UK release of Brother Sister. Among its tracks are the two bonus tracks from the UK version of the album that were unavailable stateside. The UK hit "Close To You" was previously only available on the Prêt-à-Porter motion picture soundtrack. "Bang" and "O-Fa-Fu" were a pair of B-side instrumentals from the UK CD-single of "Stay This Way" in 1992. "Keep It Coming" is an extended version of a Jan Kincaid-penned B-side on The Heavies' "Don't Let It Go to Your Head" single.

Track listing

References 

The Brand New Heavies albums
1994 albums
Delicious Vinyl albums